Prochoreutis pernivalis is a moth of the family Choreutidae. It is known from Canada, including British Columbia and  Alberta.

Prochoreutis